Fernando Garcia Sánchez (born September 25, 1953) is a retired Fleet Admiral and the Chief of Defence Staff of the Spanish Armed Forces, he took the office from December 2011 to March 24, 2017, he also chaired the Fundación Iberdrola España since 2018.

Fernando Garcia was born on September 25, 1953, in Granada, Spain. He joined the Spanish Naval Academy in 1971, after he graduated, he was commissioned to Lieutenant Junior Grade in 1976 and served in different battleships spending 2000 days in the sea. He also attended the Naval Warfare College for a diploma course.

Garcia Sánchez as a senior military officer, lectured in the Naval Warfare College and also in the Spanish Joint Staff College and was head of the Strategic Planning section of the Navy Planning division in 2003. He had also commanded the NATO 44.1 tactical operations Naval group peace missions in the Mediterranean  twice, in 2000 and in 2001.

He was promoted Rear Admiral in 2005 and Vice Admiral in 2008. He became the Chief of Staff of Defence on the December 30, 2011 after he was promoted to Admiral, prior to that, he was the Chief of Staff of the Maritime Task Force, and deputy Chief of Naval Staff. Fernando Garcia speaks English and French fluently.

He is married to Jesús Tobío Cendón with 3 children.

Decorations and badge 

 

  Grand Cross of Naval Merit
  Grand Cross of the Order of Merit of the Civil Guard
  Grand Cross of the Royal and Military Order of San Hermenegildo
  Commander with Star of the Royal and Military Order of San Hermenegildo
  Commander of the Royal and Military Order of San Hermenegildo
  Cross of the Royal and Military Order of San Hermenegildo
  Cross of Military Merit
  Cross of Naval Merit
  Cross of the Order Guard Merit of the Civil Guard
  Cross of the Order Police Merit

 

  Chevalier of the Order of National Merit of the French Republic

 

  NATO Meritorious Service Medal
  Article 5 Medal for Operation Active Endeavor

References

External links 

 
 

1953 births
Living people
Spanish generals
Grand Crosses of the Royal and Military Order of San Hermenegild
Chiefs of the Defence Staff (Spain)